The Women's recurve team event at the 2010 South American Games had its qualification during the individual qualification on March 21, and the finals on March 24.

Medalists

Results

Qualification

Draw

References
Qualification
Draw

Team Recurve Women